Loafers Glory is an unincorporated community in Mitchell County, North Carolina, United States.

It was named for the idle, or loafing, men who were a fixture at the town's general store.

References

Unincorporated communities in Mitchell County, North Carolina
Unincorporated communities in North Carolina